Confucius is a genus of leafhoppers belonging to the family Cicadellidae.

Species:

Confucius bituberculatus 
Confucius cameroni 
Confucius dispar 
Confucius granulatus 
Confucius maculatus 
Confucius ocellatus 
Confucius polemon 
Confucius zombana

References

Cicadellidae
Cicadellidae genera